Fall River Township may refer to the following townships in the United States:

 Fall River Township, LaSalle County, Illinois
 Fall River Township, Greenwood County, Kansas